Escuela Nacional Superior Autónoma de Bellas Artes del Perú (ENSABAP) (National Superior Autonomous School of Fine Arts) is a fine arts school in Lima, Peru. It is located in Barrios Altos, a suburb of Lima District. It was founded in 1918, by President José Pardo y Barreda and Peruvian painter Daniel Hernández, who was its first director. It is located in a monumental building built in the early 1940s.

The National School of Fine Arts of Peru is a public institution of higher education with university status, meaning that grants the academic degree of Bachelor and bachelor's degree in their respective careers.

Administration 
ENSABAP is governed by a General Assembly, who appoints the Technical Council, which runs the different departments painting, sculpture, engraving, restoration/conservation and visual art teaching. www.ensabap.edu.pe/transparencia.htm

Training in the Academic Program Professional Arts Education develops skills related to the pedagogical basis for professional education, visual culture, including psychological aspects, methods of programming and implementation of the project teaching, curriculum design and educational research methods, likewise powers of investigation, experimentation and analysis of theories, methods and situations to develop projects and solve problems

The Technical Council consists of the General Director, Academy Director, Administration Director, Cultural Promotion Director, four Professors, one graduate representative, and three student representatives.

Campuses
Jiron Ancash Campus
Jiron Ancash 681, Lima

Downtown Lima Property colonial founded with the name of San Ildefonso, in order to be a house of formal studies. At that time, the Kings of Spain and the Popes Urban VIII and Paul V granted it the title of Pontifical University of San Marcos. Later, the building became College, University and Clergy's Hospital. On 28 September 1918, the State officially awarded the building to the School of Fine Arts of Lima. Currently in this site are: Specialty Painting, Sculpture and Engraving, Auditorium, Audio-visual equipment and administrative offices.

Canevaro House Campus 
Jiron Ancash 769, Lima

This Lima's building dating from the colonial, was owned by the Canevaro family. The building was acquired by the Director of the ENSABAP, Juan Manuel Ugarte Elespuru, who restored it as an art school. Currently located at this site: Drawing Workshops/Atelier Area, the Fine Arts Center Pre-Free Courses and Workshops.

La Molina Campus 
Lake Avenue Rinconada 1515, La Molina (Lima)

Recently acquired by the award of the Ministry of Education. The objective in this site is to promote art, culture, educational and social activities. At present it has implemented Free Workshops/Atelier for artistic expression led to the community. Also, there are spaces dedicated to artistic exhibition individual or group exhibitions of national and foreign artists.

Cultural Center 
Jiron Huallaga 402, Lima

The building is a Republican architecture style. It has been awarded to the ENSABAP to provide a cultural center to the House Higher Studies, with the goal of spreading the artistic expressions and cultural various national as well as  international. It was inaugurated on September 27, 1996. 
It is currently located at this location: 
1 ° Level: 2 Art Galleries: Main and Underground. 
2nd Level: Teaching Specialty. 
3 ° Level: Specialty Restoration and Conservation
http://www.ensabap.edu.pe/

Directors 
 Daniel Hernández
 José Sabogal
 Germán Suárez Vértiz
 Ricardo Grau
 Gonzáles Gamarra
 Juan Manuel Ugarte Eléspuru
 Teodoro Núñez Ureta
 José Bracamonte Vera
 Alberto Dávila
 Carlos Aitor Castillo
 Miguel Baca Rossi
 Alberto Tello Montalvo
 Leslie Lee Crosby 
 Guillermo Cortez
 David Durand Ato (Present)

Notable alumni
Javier Cabada, Spanish-American abstract artist.
Boris Vallejo, Peruvian artist.

See also

References

External links 
 Escuela Nacional Superior Autónoma de Bellas Artes website
 http://www.centroculturalbellasartes.blogspot.ca/

Buildings and structures in Lima
Education in Lima
Educational institutions established in 1918
1918 establishments in Peru